Sign is an Icelandic rock band that was formed in 2000, as Halim, to compete in the Icelandic version of the Battle of the bands called Musiktilraunir.
The band 's frontman and founding member Ragnar Zolberg is also a solo artist and was a guitar player in the Swedish band Pain of Salvation.
 Sign has toured with bands such as Wednesday 13, The Wildhearts, Aiden, The Answer, Skid Row and played a show with Alice Cooper in Iceland. In August 2007 Sign played their first headline tour of the UK.

On 10 June 2008, Sign opened for Whitesnake in Reykjavik, Iceland. On 14 June 2008, Sign were the first band to play on the mainstage at Download Festival, Donington Park.

Sign recorded a cover of Iron Maiden's "Run to the Hills" on the tribute album Maiden Heaven: A Tribute to Iron Maiden released by Kerrang! magazine.

In 2013 Sign released their fifth album called "Hermd", the album is currently only available in Iceland. The album was co-produced by Sign, Daniel Bergstrand and Sorg&Umbreit and recorded at Dugout Studio in Uppsala, Sweden and Principal studios, Germany.

Personnel

Members 
Current members
Ragnar Zolberg - vocals, guitars (2000–present)
Arnar Grétarsson - guitars (2004–present)
Heimir Hjartarson - bass (2007–present)
Hálfdán Árnason - bass (2012–present)
Aggi Friðbertsson - guitar, keyboards (2008–present)
Ragnar Ólafsson - keyboards, vocals (2013–present)
Hrafnkell Örn - drums (2013–present)
Leo Margarit - drums (2013–present)

Former members
Egill Örn Rafnsson - drums (2000–2009)
Sigurður Ágúst - bass (2000–2003)
Hörður Stefánsson - guitars (2000–2001)
Baldvin Freyr (Baddi) - guitars (2001–2004)
Silli Geirdal - bass (2004–2007)
Jon Skäre - drums (2009–2012)

Lineups

Discography

Albums 
 Vindar og Breytingar (2001)
 Fyrir Ofan Himininn (2002)
 Thank God for Silence (2005)
 The Hope (2007)
 Hermd (2013)

EP 
 Sign EP (2004)
 Out from the Dirt EP (2012)

Singles 
 "So Pretty" Single (2006)

Sampler 
 Maiden Heaven (2008)
 Higher Voltage!: Another Brief History of Rock (2007)

Tours 
 16 September - 5 October 2006 - Opening for Wednesday 13 on 18 concerts in Germany, Great Britain, The Netherlands, France and Belgium.
 May 2007 - Opening for The Wildhearts in Great Britain
 8–17 August 2007 - Signs first head-line tour in Great Britain, 10 concerts.
 13 November - 1 December 2007 - Opening for Skid Row on 13 concerts in Great Britain and Iceland.
 1–11 April 2008 - 7 concerts in Iceland with Benny Crespo's Gang and Dr. Spock
 13 May - 1 June 2008 - Opening for Wednesday 13 on 11 concerts in Great Britain
 10 June 2008 - Opening for Whitesnake in Iceland
 1–31 October 2008 - Opening for Aiden in UK and Europe

References

External links 
 Sign official website
 Sign on Myspace
 Interview with Ragnar Zolberg

Musical groups established in 2001
Hard rock musical groups
Icelandic rock music groups